Edward Henry Durell (July 14, 1810 – March 29, 1887) was the 25th Mayor of New Orleans, Louisiana and a United States district judge of the United States District Court for the District of Louisiana and the United States District Court for the Eastern District of Louisiana.

Education and career

Born on July 14, 1810, in the Governor Wentworth House in Portsmouth, New Hampshire, Durell attended Phillips Exeter Academy, then graduated from Harvard University in 1831, and read law in 1834. He was fluent in German, French and Spanish. He entered private practice in Pittsburg, Mississippi and New Orleans, Louisiana from 1835 to 1854. He was a member of the New Orleans City Council in 1854. He resumed private practice in New Orleans. He was President of the Bureau of Finance in New Orleans from 1862 to 1863. He was the 25th Mayor of New Orleans in 1863. Durell was a member of the Republican Party.

Federal judicial service

Durell was nominated by President Lincoln to the United States District Court for the Eastern District of Louisiana on January 5, 1864. The Senate returned the nomination to the President on February 3, 1864.

Durell received a recess appointment from President Abraham Lincoln on May 20, 1863, to a seat on the United States District Court for the Eastern District of Louisiana vacated by Judge Theodore Howard McCaleb. He was nominated to the same position by President Lincoln on February 8, 1864. He was confirmed by the United States Senate on February 17, 1864, and received his commission the same day. Durell was reassigned by operation of law to the United States District Court for the District of Louisiana on July 27, 1866, to a new seat authorized by 14 Stat. 300. His service terminated on December 4, 1874, due to his resignation.

Circumstances of his resignation

Durell resigned after the United States House Committee on the Judiciary voted to recommend to the full United States House of Representatives that he be impeached for misconduct. Durell had been accused of irregularities in bankruptcy proceedings, corruption and drunkenness.

Later career and death

Following his resignation from the federal bench, Durell returned to private practice in Newburgh and Schoharie, New York from 1875 to 1877. He died on March 29, 1887, in Schoharie. He was interred in Pine Hill Cemetery in Dover, New Hampshire. He attempted to write a history of the South which was never completed.

Personal

After moving to New York, Durell married a widow, Mary Seitz Gebhart.

Books

In 1845, Durell's book, New Orleans as I Found It, was published under the pen name H. Didimus. The book deals with Durell's experience when arriving at New Orleans and how things are different from other places in the United States. Published in 1867, Durell participated in the formation of Rules, Orders and Regulations in Bankruptcy : Adopted by the Hon. Edward H. Durell, Judge of the District Court of the United States, for the District of Louisiana, July 15, 1867. This book consists of 24 adopted rules that deal with bankruptcy.

References

Sources

External links
 
Edward H. Durell Papers at New-York Historical Society Library

1810 births
1887 deaths
Mayors of New Orleans
Harvard College alumni
Judges of the United States District Court for the Eastern District of Louisiana
Judges of the United States District Court for the District of Louisiana
United States federal judges appointed by Abraham Lincoln
19th-century American judges
Politicians from Portsmouth, New Hampshire
Phillips Exeter Academy alumni
New Orleans City Council members
Louisiana lawyers
19th-century American lawyers
19th-century American politicians
United States federal judges admitted to the practice of law by reading law
Louisiana politicians convicted of crimes